= Monte Grosso oil field =

Oil field in Southern Apennines, Italy

Monte Grosso
- Country: Italy
- Region: Southern Apennines
- Location: Southern Apennines
- Offshore/onshore: onshore
- Operator: Mediterranean Oil & Gas
- Partners: Total S.A., Mediterranean Oil & Gas, Eni

Field history
- Discovery: 2006
- Start of production: 2011
- Peak year: 2015
- Abandonment: 2020+

Production
- Current production of oil: 15,000 barrels per day (~7.5×10^{5} t/a)
- Estimated oil in place: 100 million barrels (~1.4×10^{7} t)

The Monte Grosso oil field is an oil field located in the region of the Southern Apennines. It was discovered in 2006 and developed by Mediterranean Oil & Gas. It will begin production in 2011 and will produce oil. The total proven reserves of the Monte Grosso oil field are around 100 million barrels (17.7 million tonnes), and production is centered on 15,000 barrels per day (2,400 m^{3}/d).
